The Nottingham East by-election was a Parliamentary by-election held on 19 April 1912. It returned one Member of Parliament (MP)  to the House of Commons of the Parliament of the United Kingdom, elected by the first past the post voting system.

Electoral history

Candidates

Result

Aftermath
A General Election was due to take place by the end of 1915. By the autumn of 1914, the following candidates had been adopted to contest that election. Due to the outbreak of war, the election never took place.

Rees was the endorsed candidate of the Coalition Government.

References
 Craig, F. W. S. (1974). British parliamentary election results 1885-1918 (1 ed.). London: Macmillan.
 Wikipedia: en.wikipedia.org
 Who's Who: www.ukwhoswho.com
 Debrett's House of Commons 1916

1912 elections in the United Kingdom
1912 in England
20th century in Nottingham
Elections in Nottingham
By-elections to the Parliament of the United Kingdom in Nottinghamshire constituencies